Oudka is a commune in the Taounate Province of the Taza-Al Hoceima-Taounate administrative region of Morocco. At the time of the 2004 census, the commune had a population of 8392 people living in 1601 households.

References

Populated places in Taounate Province
Rural communes of Fès-Meknès